Bachri is a village in Piro block of Bhojpur district, Bihar, India. It is located south of Piro. As of 2011, its population was 3,476, in 583 households.

References 

Villages in Bhojpur district, India